Jai alai is a sport involving bouncing a ball off a walled-in space by accelerating it to high speeds with a hand-held wicker cesta. It is a variation of Basque pelota. The term jai alai, coined by Serafin Baroja in 1875, is also often loosely applied to the fronton (the open-walled playing area) where matches take place. The game, whose name means "merry festival" in Basque, is called cesta-punta ("basket tip") in the Basque Country. The sport is played worldwide, but especially in Spain, France, and in various Latin American countries.

Rules and customs 

The court for jai alai consists of walls on the front, back and left, and the floor between them. If the ball (called a pelota in Spanish, pilota in Standard Basque) touches the floor outside these walls, it is considered out of bounds. Similarly, there is also a border on the lower  of the front wall that is also out of bounds. The ceiling on the court is usually very high, so the ball has a more predictable path. The court is divided by 14 parallel lines going horizontally across the court, with line 1 closest to the front wall and line 14 the back wall. In doubles, each team consists of a frontcourt player and a backcourt player. The game begins when the frontcourt player of the first team serves the ball to the second team. The winner of each point stays on the court to meet the next team in rotation. Losers go to the end of the line to await another turn on the court. The first team to score 7 points (or 9 in Superfecta games) wins. The next highest scores are awarded "place" (second) and "show" (third) positions, respectively. Playoffs decide tied scores.

A jai alai game is played in round robin format, usually between eight teams of two players each or eight single players. The first team to score 7 or 9 points wins the game. Two of the eight teams are in the court for each point. The server on one team must bounce the ball behind the serving line, then with the cesta "basket" hurl it towards the front wall so it bounces from there to between lines 4 and 7 on the floor. The ball is then in play. The ball used in jai alai is hand crafted and consists of metal strands tightly wound together and then wrapped in goat skin. Teams alternate catching the ball in their (also hand crafted) cesta and throwing it "in one fluid motion" without holding or juggling it. The ball must be caught either on the fly or after bouncing once on the floor. A team scores a point if an opposing player:

 fails to serve the ball directly to the front wall so that upon rebound it will bounce between lines No. 4 and 7. If it does not, it is an under or over serve and the other team will receive the point.
 fails to catch the ball on the fly or after one bounce
 holds or juggles the ball
 hurls the ball out of bounds
 interferes with a player attempting to catch and hurl the ball

The team scoring a point remains in the court and the opposing team rotates off the court to the end of the list of opponents. Points usually double after the first round of play, once each team has played at least one point. When a game is played with points doubling after the first round, this is called "Spectacular Seven" scoring.

The players frequently attempt a "chula" shot, where the ball is played off the front wall very high, then reaches the bottom of the back wall by the end of its arc. The bounce off the bottom of the back wall can be very low, and the ball is very difficult to return in this situation.

Since there is no wall on the right side, all jai alai players must play right-handed (wear the cesta on their right hand), as the spin of a left-handed hurl would send the ball toward the open right side.

The Basque government promotes jai alai as "the fastest sport in the world" because of the speed of the ball.

The sport can be dangerous, as the ball travels at high velocities. It has led to injuries that caused players to retire and fatalities have been recorded in some cases.

Industry 

Jai alai is a popular sport within the Latin American countries and the Philippines from its Hispanic influence. It was one of the two gambling sports from Europe, the other being horse racing, in the semi-colonial Chinese cities of Shanghai and Tianjin, and was shut down after the communist victory there. The jai alai arena in Tianjin's former Italian Concession was then confiscated and turned into a recreation center for the city's working class.

The Philippines
Jai alai was played in Manila at the Manila Jai Alai Building, one of the most significant Art Deco buildings in Asia that was demolished  in 2000 by the Manila city government. Earlier in 1986, jai alai was banned nationwide because of problems with game fixing. However, jai alai returned to the country in March 2010. In 2011, jai-alai was briefly shut down in the province of Pangasinan when it was found to have links to illegal jueteng gambling, but it was resumed after a court order.

United States

In the United States, jai alai enjoyed some popularity as a gambling alternative to horse racing, greyhound racing, and harness racing, and was particularly popular in Florida and Connecticut, where the game was used as a basis for Parimutuel betting. Florida at one point had at least six frontons throughout the state: Dania Beach, Fort Pierce, Jasper, Casselberry, Miami, and Reddick. However, only 1 fronton remains open.

The first jai alai fronton in the United States was located in St. Louis, Missouri, operating around the time of the 1904 World's Fair. The first fronton in Florida opened at the site of Hialeah Race Course near Miami in 1924. The fronton was relocated to its present site in Miami near Miami International Airport. The Miami Jai-Alai Fronton was the biggest in the world with a record audience of 15,502 people on 27 December 1975.  and Dania Jai Alai which closed in November 2021. Seasonal facilities were located at Fort Pierce, Ocala and Hamilton. The Tampa Jai Alai fronton opened in 1952 and operated until 1998. Inactive jai alai permits were also located in Tampa, Daytona Beach, West Palm Beach, and Quincy. One Florida fronton, in Melbourne, was converted from jai alai to greyhound racing, although it later closed.

Professional Jai-Alai frontons no longer exist in the northeastern and western United States, waning as other gambling options became available. In Connecticut, frontons in Hartford and Milford permanently closed, while the fronton in Bridgeport was converted to a greyhound race track, which too later closed. In 2003, the fronton at Newport Jai Alai in Newport, Rhode Island, was converted into Newport Grand, a slot machine and video lottery terminal parlor, which closed permanently in August 2018.

Jai alai enjoyed a brief and popular stint in Las Vegas with the opening of a fronton at the MGM Grand Hotel and Casino; however, by the early 1980s the fronton was losing money and was closed by MGM Grand owner Kirk Kerkorian. The MGM Grand in Reno also showcased jai alai for a very short period (1978–1980).

After the 1968 season, players returned home and threatened not to come back unless the owners improved their work conditions. The owners, however, offered the same terms and started hiring inexperienced players instead of the world-class stars. The public did not notice the change. Later strikes were placated with salary rises.

In 1988–1991, the International Jai-Alai Players Association held the longest strike in American professional sport. The owners substituted with Americans raised locally, while the strikers picketed the courts for years. The players, 90% of them Basque, felt insecure submitted to the will of their employers. Spain was no longer a poor conservative country and the new generation of players were influenced by leftist Basque nationalism. The strike ended with an agreement. Meanwhile, Native American casinos and state lotteries had appeared as an alternative to jai-alai betting.

In an effort to prevent the closure of frontons in Florida, the Florida State Legislature passed HB 1059, a bill that changed the rules regarding the operation and wagering of poker in a Pari-Mutuel facility such as a jai alai fronton and a greyhound and horseracing track. The bill became law on August 6, 2003.
In the mid-to-late 20th century, games could draw 5,000 spectators, a figure that fell to as few as 50 by 2017.

Amateur jai-alai
Although the sport has been in decline in America for several years, the first public amateur jai alai facility was in Milford CT and owned by Charlie Hernandez. Future frontons were built in the United States, including one in 2008 in St. Petersburg, Florida, with the assistance of the city of St. Petersburg and private funding from Jeff Conway (Laca).

In addition to the amateur court in St. Petersburg, The American Jai-Alai Foundation offers lessons. Its president, Victor Valcarce, was a pelotari at Dania Jai-Alai (MAGO) and was considered the best "pelota de goma" (rubber ball) player in the world. Sponsored in North Miami Beach, Florida which was once owned by World Jai-Alai as a school that, in 1972, produced the greatest American pelotari, Joey Cornblit.

During the late 1960s, in addition to North Miami Amateur, at least one other amateur court from International Amateur Jai-Alai in South Miami professional players emerged at World Jai-Alai, regarded as the first American pelotari who turned pro in 1968 and enjoyed a lengthy career. In the 1970s and early 1980s, Orbea's Jai-Alai in Hialeah featured four indoor courts. Two of the courts played with hard rubber balls ("pelota de goma") were shorter than a standard court (respectively) and used for training players and amateur leagues. In addition, two courts were played with the regulation pelota (hardball / "pelota dura"), one short in length and one regulation length. Orbea's also sold equipment such as cestas and helmets.

Retired players visited and played as well as highly skilled amateurs, pros from Miami Jai-Alai and various other professional frontons operating at the time. The contributions of the South Miami, North Miami, Orbea, and, later, the Milford amateur courts to what is generally considered to be the golden age of the amateur jai-alai player and the sport in the United States are impressive. In the late 1980s, at least one other amateur court was constructed in Connecticut.

Dania Jai Alai has a "Hall of Fame" that documents the best front and back court players.

See also 
 Basque Pelota World Championships

References

External links

  History of Jai-Alai 
 "The History of basque Pelota in the Americas" by Carmelo Urza
30 for 30: What the Hell Happened to Jai Alai? ESPN short on YouTube 
 
 Jai Alai Blues at Euskal Telebista's video-on-demand service  
Slow death of a fast game, The Observer, July 2009
 Frontons.net is a collaborative project aimed at identifying and geotagging open-air single walled fronton around the world.
 Forgotten – documentary about the decline of Jai alai in Miami

Basque pelota
Sports in Florida
Sports in Connecticut
Sports in the Philippines
Games and sports introduced in the 1870s
Sports originating in Spain
1875 establishments in Spain